Rödliner See is a lake in the Mecklenburgische Seenplatte district in Mecklenburg-Vorpommern, Germany. At an elevation of 62.8 m, its surface area is 1.97 km².

Lakes of Mecklenburg-Western Pomerania